Nobel often refers to:

Nobel Prize, awarded annually since 1901, from the bequest of Swedish inventor Alfred Nobel

Nobel may also refer to:

Companies
AkzoNobel, the result of the merger between Akzo and Nobel Industries in 1994
Branobel, or The Petroleum Production Company Nobel Brothers, Limited, an oil industry cofounded by Ludvig and Robert Nobel
Dynamit Nobel, a German chemical and weapons company founded in 1865 by Alfred Nobel
Nobel Biocare, a bio-tech company, formerly a subsidiary of Nobel Industries
Nobel Enterprises, a UK chemicals company founded by Alfred Nobel
NobelTel, a telecommunications company founded in 1998 by Thomas Knobel

Geography
Nobel (crater), a crater on the far side of the Moon.
Nobel, Ontario, a village located in Ontario, Canada.
6032 Nobel, a main-belt asteroid

Other uses
The Nobel family, a prominent Swedish and Russian family
Nobel (automobile) a licence-built version of the German Fuldamobil, manufactured in the UK and Chile
Nobel (TV series), a Norwegian television series about the country's military involvement in Afghanistan
Nobel (typeface), a geometric, sans-serif typeface.
Nobel Charitable Trust (NCT), a charity established by some descendants of Ludvig Nobel's
Nobel Ice (Fabergé egg), also referred to as the Snowflake egg
Nobelite, an employee of the Nobel family's companies
Nobelium, a synthetic element with the symbol No and atomic number 102, named after Alfred Nobel
The Nobel School, a secondary school in Stevenage, England.

See also
Noble (disambiguation)